Pilumnus is a genus of crabs, containing the following species:

Pilumnus acanthosoma Ng, 2000
Pilumnus acer Rathbun, 1923
Pilumnus acutifrons Rathbun, 1906
Pilumnus aestuarii Nardo, 1869
Pilumnus affinis Brito Capello, 1875
Pilumnus alcocki Borradaile, 1902
Pilumnus annamensis Takeda & Miyake, 1968
Pilumnus australis Whitelegge, 1900
Pilumnus balssi Takeda & Miyake, 1972
Pilumnus bleekeri Miers, 1880
Pilumnus braueri Balss, 1933
Pilumnus caerulescens A. Milne-Edwards, 1873
Pilumnus capillatus Ng, Dai & Yang, 1997
Pilumnus caribaeus Desbonne in Desbonne & Schramm, 1867
Pilumnus ceylonicus Deb, 1987
Pilumnus chani Ng & Ho, 2003
Pilumnus comatus Ng, Dai & Yang, 1997
Pilumnus contrarius Rathbun, 1923
Pilumnus cursor A. Milne-Edwards, 1873
Pilumnus danai Stimpson, 1907
Pilumnus dasypodus Kingsley, 1879
Pilumnus deflexus A. Milne-Edwards, 1867
Pilumnus depressus Stimpson, 1871
Pilumnus digitalis Rathbun, 1923
Pilumnus diomedeae Rathbun, 1894
Pilumnus dofleini Balss, 1933
Pilumnus elegans de Man, 1888
Pilumnus etheridgei Rathbun, 1923
Pilumnus eudaemoneus Nobili, 1905
Pilumnus fernandezi Garth, 1973
Pilumnus fissifrons Stimpson, 1858
Pilumnus floridanus Stimpson, 1871
Pilumnus gemmatus Stimpson, 1860
Pilumnus gonzalensis Rathbun, 1894
Pilumnus gracilipes A. Milne-Edwards, 1880
Pilumnus granti Montgomery, 1931
Pilumnus guinotae Takeda & Miyake, 1968
Pilumnus habei Takeda & Miyake, 1972
Pilumnus haswelli de Man, 1888
Pilumnus hirtellus (Linnaeus, 1761)
Pilumnus holosericus Rathbun, 1898
Pilumnus humilis Miers, 1884
Pilumnus ikedai Takeda & Miyake, 1968
Pilumnus incanus (Forskål, 1775)
Pilumnus indicus (Deb, 1987)
Pilumnus inermis A. Milne-Edwards & Bouvier, 1894
Pilumnus infraciliaris Ortmann, 1894
Pilumnus integifrons Shen, 1948
Pilumnus investigatoris Deb, 1987
Pilumnus izuogasawarensis Takeda & Ng, 1997
Pilumnus karachiensis Deb, 1987
Pilumnus kempi Deb, 1987
Pilumnus kingstoni (Rathbun, 1923)
Pilumnus koepckei Türkay, 1967
Pilumnus lacteus Stimpson, 1871
Pilumnus laevigatus (Rathbun, 1911)
Pilumnus lanatus Latreille, 1825
Pilumnus limosus Smith, 1869
Pilumnus longicornis Hilgendorf, 1878
Pilumnus longipes A. Milne-Edwards, 1873
Pilumnus longleyi Rathbun, 1930
Pilumnus lumpinus Bennett, 1964
Pilumnus maccullochi Montgomery, 1931
Pilumnus maldivensis Borradaile, 1902
Pilumnus marshi Rathbun, 1901
Pilumnus merodentatus Nobili, 1906
Pilumnus miersii A. Milne-Edwards, 1880
Pilumnus minutus De Haan, 1835
Pilumnus monilifera Haswell, 1882
Pilumnus murphyi Ng, 1988
Pilumnus neglectus Balss, 1933
Pilumnus nobilii Garth, 1948
Pilumnus normani Miers, 1886
Pilumnus novaezealandiae Filhol, 1885
Pilumnus nudimanus Rathbun, 1901
Pilumnus nuttingi Rathbun, 1906
Pilumnus oahuensis Edmondson, 1931
Pilumnus ohshimai Takeda & Miyake, 1970
Pilumnus orbitospinis Rathbun, 1911
Pilumnus palmeri Garth, 1986
Pilumnus pannosus Rathbun, 1896
Pilumnus parableekeri Ng & L. W. H. Tan, 1984
Pilumnus parapilumnoides Takeda & Miyake, 1970
Pilumnus parvulus Nobili, 1906
Pilumnus perlatus
Pilumnus peronii H. Milne Edwards, 1834
Pilumnus perrieri A. Milne-Edwards & Bouvier, 1898
Pilumnus pileiferus Ng & L. W. H. Tan, 1984
Pilumnus propinquus Nobili, 1905
Pilumnus prunosus Whitelegge, 1897
Pilumnus pulcher Miers, 1884
Pilumnus purpureus A. Milne-Edwards, 1873
Pilumnus pygmaeus Boone, 1927
Pilumnus quoii H. Milne-Edwards, 1834
Pilumnus ransoni Forest & Guinot, 1961
Pilumnus reticulatus Stimpson, 1860
Pilumnus rotumanus Borradaile, 1900
Pilumnus rotundus Borradaile, 1902
Pilumnus rubroseta Ng, Dai & Yang, 1997
Pilumnus rufopunctatus Stimpson, 1858
Pilumnus savignyi Heller, 1861
Pilumnus sayi Rathbun, 1897
Pilumnus scabriusculus Adams & White, 1849
Pilumnus schellenbergi Balss, 1933
Pilumnus semilanatus Miers, 1884
Pilumnus semilunaris Ng, Dai & Yang, 1997
Pilumnus senahai Takeda & Miyake, 1968
Pilumnus serenei Ng, 1988
Pilumnus sluiteri de Man, 1892
Pilumnus spinicarpus Grant & McCulloch, 1906
Pilumnus spinifer H. Milne-Edwards, 1834
Pilumnus spinifrons Ng & L. W. H. Tan, 1984
Pilumnus spinohirsutus (Lockington, 1877)
Pilumnus spinosissimus Rathbun, 1898
Pilumnus spinosus Filhol, 1885
Pilumnus spinulus Shen, 1932
Pilumnus stebbingi Capart, 1951
Pilumnus stimpsonii Miers, 1886
Pilumnus striatus de Man, 1888
Pilumnus taeniola Rathbun, 1906
Pilumnus tahitensis de Man, 1890
Pilumnus takedai Ng, 1988
Pilumnus tantulus Rathbun, 1923
Pilumnus tectus Rathbun, 1933
Pilumnus teixeiranus Brito Capello, 1875
Pilumnus tenellus Dana, 1852
Pilumnus terraereginae Haswell, 1882
Pilumnus thoe (Herbst, 1803)
Pilumnus tomentosus Latreille, 1825
Pilumnus townsendi Rathbun, 1923
Pilumnus trichophoroides de Man, 1895
Pilumnus trispinosus (Sakai, 1965)
Pilumnus tuantaoensis Shen, 1948
Pilumnus turgidulus Rathbun, 1911
Pilumnus verrucimanus Klunzinger, 1913
Pilumnus vespertilio (Fabricius, 1793)
Pilumnus vestitus Haswell, 1882
Pilumnus villosissimus (Rafinesque, 1814)
Pilumnus woodworthi Rathbun, 1902
Pilumnus xantusii Stimpson, 1860
Pilumnus zimmeri Balss, 1933

References

Pilumnoidea
Decapod genera